Operation Christmas Drop is a tradition that started in 1952 that serves as a training mission for the U.S. Air Force. It has since become the longest-running U.S. Department of Defense mission in full operation, and the longest-running humanitarian airlift in the world. Supported by the local communities of Guam, it is primarily conducted from Andersen Air Force Base and Yokota Air Base, and targets Micronesia.

Description
The drop is the oldest ongoing Department of Defense mission which remains in full operation, and the longest running humanitarian airlift in the world. The operation gives troops the chance to practice humanitarian aid drops, which they may later be expected to conduct during deployment.

Volunteers from Andersen Air Force Base, including 734th Air Mobility Squadron, and both crew and aircraft from the 36th Airlift Squadron at Yokota Air Base, Japan, participate in the operation. Members of the Guam community also help the operation. Money is raised for the operation by sponsored activities such as golf tournaments and sponsored runs, as well as local businesses sponsoring individual boxes.

The containers are dropped in water just off the beaches in order to avoid them hitting the locals.

History 

The operation was first conducted in 1951, when the aircrew of a WB-29 aircraft assigned to the 54th Weather Reconnaissance Squadron, formerly assigned to Andersen Air Force Base in Guam, was flying a mission to the south of Guam over the Micronesian atoll of Kapingamarangi. When they saw the islanders waving to them, the crew quickly gathered some items they had on the plane, placed them in a container with a parachute attached and dropped the cargo as they circled again. 

A witness to the first drop on the island of Agrigan said "We saw these things come out of the back of the airplane and I was yelling: 'There are toys coming down'". At the time the island had no electricity or running water, and the islands were periodically hit by typhoons. Some of the first containers failed to arrive where intended, and islanders swam out to retrieve some, while others were discovered months later some miles away.

The 2006 operation saw 140 boxes dropped to 59 islands. The 2011 operation included dropping twenty five boxes of IV fluids to Fais Island in order to combat a local outbreak of dengue fever. 

In 2014, The Pacific Air Forces delivered 50,000 pounds of supplies to 56 Micronesian Islands.

In 2015, the Japan Air Self-Defense Force and the Royal Australian Air Force participated in the operation along with the United States Air Force. Japan and Australia each provided one C-130 Hercules to join the three C-130s provided by the United States. The JASDF and RAAF also participated in the 2016 and 2017 operations.

December 2017 marked the inaugural training event for the new C-130J from Yokota AB as well as the first quad-lateral event with the JASDF, RAAF and Philippine Air Force.

In response to the COVID-19 pandemic, Micronesian president David Panuelo opted out of the 69th Operation Christmas Drop in 2020. According to master sergeant Anthony Biecheler, the drop will continue as planned over the Republic of Palau and the US Air Force has taken extensive measures to prevent the spread of COVID-19 from the deliveries.

In media 
Operation Christmas Drop is fictionally portrayed in a Netflix film of the same name. The film debuted on the platform on November 5th, 2020 and stars Kat Graham and Alexander Ludwig.

See also 
 Federated States of Micronesia–United States relations
 International Ice Patrol
 NORAD Tracks Santa

References 

US, Japan to kick off Operation Christmas Drop despite COVID-19
By Tech. Sgt. Nick Wilson, Pacific Air Forces Public Affairs / Published November 25, 2020
https://www.pacaf.af.mil/News/Article-Display/Article/2428472/us-japan-to-kick-off-operation-christmas-drop-despite-covid-19/

External links 

 

1952 establishments in Guam
Christmas events and celebrations
Christmas in the United States
Christmas traditions
Federated States of Micronesia culture
Guamanian culture
Humanitarian aid
Humanitarian missions of the United States Air Force
Christmas Drop
Recurring events established in 1952